Kristina Repelewska (born 7 January 1981) is a Polish handball player. She plays for the club MKS Lublin, and is member of the Polish national team. She competed at the 2015 World Women's Handball Championship in Denmark.

References

1981 births
Living people
Polish female handball players
Place of birth missing (living people)
Sportspeople from Minsk
21st-century Polish women